The Turkish Federation Cup was the first professional national football league in Turkey and the predecessor to the Super League. It was organized by the Turkish Football Federation and was held in order to bring forth a national champion that would represent Turkey in the European Cup. It was held in 1956 and 1957. Beşiktaş won both editions.

Winners

See also
Turkish Football Championship
Turkish National Division
List of Turkish football champions

References

 
Defunct football cup competitions in Turkey
Recurring sporting events established in 1956
1956 establishments in Turkey
1958 disestablishments in Turkey
Defunct top level football leagues in Europe